Vanessa Flores Bear (born 26 May 1997) is an American-born Mexican footballer who played as centre back for Tigres UANL and the Mexico women's national team.

She was the first foreign-born Mexican player who signed with a Liga MX Femenil club.

International career
Flores represented Mexico at the 2013 CONCACAF Women's U-17 Championship, the 2014 FIFA U-17 Women's World Cup, the 2015 CONCACAF Women's U-20 Championship and the 2016 FIFA U-20 Women's World Cup. She made her senior debut on 4 February 2017 in a friendly match against Canada.

Honors and awards

International
Mexico U17
 CONCACAF Women's U-17 Championship: 2013

See also 
 List of Mexico women's international footballers

References

External links
 
 
 

1997 births
Living people
Citizens of Mexico through descent
Mexican women's footballers
Women's association football central defenders
Mexico women's international footballers
Mexican people of American descent
Liga MX Femenil players
Tigres UANL (women) footballers
American women's soccer players
Soccer players from Houston
American sportspeople of Mexican descent
West Virginia Mountaineers women's soccer players